Ernest Dureuil was a Belgian gymnast. He competed in the men's team, Swedish system event at the 1920 Summer Olympics, winning the bronze medal.

References

Year of birth missing
Year of death missing
Belgian male artistic gymnasts
Olympic gymnasts of Belgium
Gymnasts at the 1920 Summer Olympics
Olympic bronze medalists for Belgium
Medalists at the 1920 Summer Olympics
Olympic medalists in gymnastics
Place of birth missing